St Helen Auckland is a village in County Durham, in England. It is south-west of Bishop Auckland. It is named after St. Helen in distinction from Bishop Auckland as the church is dedicated to her (the Church of St Helen, St Helen Auckland).

External links

 St Helen's Church

Saint Helen Auckland